The 1999 season is the 77th season of competitive football in Ecuador.

National leagues

Serie A
Champion: LDU Quito (6th title)
International cup qualifiers:
2000 Copa Libertadores: LDU Quito, El Nacional, Emelec
Relegated: Delfín, Deportivo Cuenca, Audaz Octubrino

Serie B
Winner: Técnico Universitario (3rd title)
Promoted: Técnico Universitario
Relegated: Deportivo Quinindé

Segunda
Winner: Deportivo Saquisilí
Promoted: Deportivo Saquisilí

Clubs in international competitions

National teams

Senior team
The Ecuador national team played in seventeen matches in 1999: three Copa América matches and 14 friendlies.

Copa América
Ecuador was drawn into Group C with Argentina, Colombia, and Uruguay. They lost all their matches and were eliminated in the Group Stage.

Friendlies

Canada Cup
Ecuador was invited to play in the Canada Cup, a friendly competition amongst national sides held in Edmonton. Ecuador won the competition for the senior side's first international trophy.

Notes
1.Not a full FIFA international match because Denmark fielded a team with only players from its own league.
2.Guatemala fielded its U-23 team. It is still considered as a full FIFA international match.
3.Canada fielded its U-23 team. It is still considered as a full FIFA international match.

External links
 National leagues details on RSSSF

 
1999